Perutz Glacier is a glacier, 10 nautical miles (18 km) long and 2 nautical miles (3.7 km) wide, which flows west-northwest from Hemimont Plateau into Bourgeois Fjord, close east of Thomson Head, on the west coast of Graham Land, Antarctica. The mouth of the glacier was first surveyed in 1936 by the British Graham Land Expedition (BGLE) under Rymill. The entire glacier was surveyed in 1946-47 and 1948-49 by the Falkland Islands Dependencies Survey (FIDS), and named by them for Max F. Perutz of the Cavendish Laboratory, Cambridge, who has made important studies on the mechanism of glacier flow.

Glaciers of Fallières Coast